Frank "Stitch" Kyle (May 23, 1882 – October 22, 1929) was an American football player and coach.

Early years
He attended preparatory school at Mooney School in Franklin, Tennessee along with Red Smith and Ed Hamilton.

Vanderbilt University
Kyle played for the Vanderbilt Commodores of Vanderbilt University from 1902 to 1905. He was the first quarterback to play for Dan McGugin's Commodores, selected for All-Southern teams in 1903 and 1904. He stood 5 feet 11 inches and weighed 162 pounds.

Coaching career

Ole Miss
Kyle served as the head football coach at the University of Mississippi (Ole Miss) in 1908. During his one-season tenure at Mississippi, Kyle compiled an overall record of three wins and five losses (3–5).

Later life
Kyle later lived in Celina, Tennessee and died in 1929.

Head coaching record

References

External links
 

1882 births
1929 deaths
American football quarterbacks
Ole Miss Rebels football coaches
Vanderbilt Commodores football players
All-Southern college football players
People from Clay County, Tennessee